In geometry, a tame manifold is a manifold with a well-behaved compactification.  More precisely, a manifold  is called tame if it is homeomorphic to a compact manifold with a closed subset of the boundary removed.

The Whitehead manifold is an example of a contractible manifold that is not tame.

See also

References 

 
 
 

Differential geometry
Hyperbolic geometry
Manifolds